For information on all University of South Alabama sports, see South Alabama Jaguars

The South Alabama Jaguars baseball team is a varsity intercollegiate athletic team of the University of South Alabama in Mobile, Alabama, United States. The team is a member of the Sun Belt Conference, which is part of the National Collegiate Athletic Association's Division I. The team plays its home games at Eddie Stanky Field in Mobile, Alabama. The Jaguars are coached by Mark Calvi.

Year-by-year results

South Alabama Players That Played in MLB
Marlon Anderson
Allen Battle
Glenn Borgman
Pete Coachman
Mark Ettles
Steve Falteisek
David Freese
Jay Gainer
Luis Gonzalez
Lance Johnson
Jon Lieber
Adam Lind
Mike Maksudian
Mike Mordecai
Mike Nakamura
Mike O'Berry
Jordan Patterson
Juan Pierre
Pat Putnam
Stephen Sparks
David Stapleton
Travis Swaggerty
PJ Walters
Turner Ward

South Alabama All- Americans

South Alabama All-Americans
1971 Glenn Borgmann, C
1973 Ernie Rosseau, OF
1978 Mark Johnston, OF
1984 Pete Coachman, 3B
1984 Lance Johnson, OF
1986 Tim Becker, SS
1986 Mike Dull, 3B
1988 Luis Gonzalez, 1B
1989 Mike Mordecai, SS
1990 Mike Zimmerman, P
1992 Andrew Kontorinis, 1B
1992 Jon Lieber, P
1995 Marlon Anderson, 2B
1996 Jason Norton, P
1996 Mike Nakamura, P
1998 Mike Fischer, P
1998 Juan Pierre, OF
1999 Eben Wells, OF
2002 Ryan Mulhern, OF
2003 Ryan Mulhern, OF
2004 Adam Lind, OF
2004 P.J. Walters, P
2006 David Freese, 3B
2006 P.J. Walters, P
2007 Jeff Cunningham, 1B
2008 Ryne Jernigan, 2B
2009 David Doss, C
2013 Jordan Patterson, UT
2015 Kevin Hill, P
2016 Kevin Hill, P

South Alabama Freshmen All-Americans
1986 Luis Gonzalez, 1B
1987 Mike Mordecai, SS
1995 Mike Nakamura, P
1995 Dave Crittenden, OF
1996 Seth Taylor, SS
1999 Tim Merritt, OF
2001 Clark Girardeau
2003 Adam Lind, OF
2004 P.J. Walters, P
2006 David Doss, DH
2011 Logan Kirkland, SS
2016 Travis Swaggerty, OF

See also
List of NCAA Division I baseball programs

References

External links
 

 
Baseball teams established in 1965
1965 establishments in Alabama